Portland, Maine, held an election for mayor on November 3, 2015. It was the second election since Portland voters approved a citywide referendum changing the city charter to recreate an elected mayor position in 2010.

The new citizen-elected mayor serves full-time in the position for a four-year term, exercises the powers and duties enumerated in Article II Section 5 of the Portland City Charter, be elected using instant-runoff voting, and, like the rest of municipal government in Portland, be officially non-partisan. Ethan Strimling defeated incumbent mayor Michael F. Brennan and fellow challenger Tom MacMillan.

Candidates

Official candidates
 Michael Brennan, incumbent mayor of Portland and Back Cove resident
 Tom MacMillan, Portland chair of the Maine Green Independent Party and Parkside resident
 Ethan Strimling, former State Senator, political pundit, and West End resident

Failed to make ballot
 Christopher Vail, North Deering resident, Portland firefighter

Declined
 Jill Duson, at-large city councilor and candidate for mayor in 2011
 Cheryl Leeman, former city councilor for District 4 (1984–2014) and former mayor (1988–1989; 2000-2001)
 Jon Hinck, at-large city councilor, former State Representative, and candidate for the U.S. Senate in 2012
 David Marshall, city councilor for District 2 and candidate for mayor in 2011
 Nicholas Mavodones, at-large city councilor, former mayor (1999–2000; 2006–2007; 2010–2011), and candidate for mayor in 2011 (endorsed Strimling)
 Jed Rathband, political consultant and candidate for mayor in 2011
 Edward Suslovic, city councilor for District 3, former mayor (2007–2008), and former state representative (endorsed Strimling)

Campaign
The day after Ethan Strimling announced his candidacy for mayor, a group of city councilors and school board members led by Nicholas Mavodones announced their opposition to the reelection of Mayor Brennan and support of Strimling.  Mavodones cited division within the city and city government as well as an atmosphere of frustration under Brennan's leadership.

Endorsements

Polling

Election results
Election Night Results

See also 
 List of mayors of Portland, Maine

References

External links
Voter Registration/Elections Official elections & voting information published & maintained by the Portland City Clerk

2015 Maine elections
2015 United States mayoral elections
2015
21st century in Portland, Maine
Non-partisan elections